Simmons-Harth House, also known as the Simmons-Harth-Gantt House, is a historic home located at Lexington, Lexington County, South Carolina. It was built about 1830, and is a two-story, rectangular, later Federal style frame dwelling.  It has a gable roof and is sheathed in weatherboard. The front façade features a double-tiered, pedimented portico with slender wooden columns.  It is one of nine surviving antebellum houses in Lexington.

It was listed on the National Register of Historic Places in 1983.

References 

Houses on the National Register of Historic Places in South Carolina
Houses completed in 1830
Houses in Lexington County, South Carolina
National Register of Historic Places in Lexington County, South Carolina
1830 establishments in South Carolina